The Dartmouth Big Green team is the intercollegiate men's squash team for Dartmouth College located in Hanover, New Hampshire. The team competes in the Ivy League within the College Squash Association. The university first fielded a squash team in 1935. The current is head coach is former professional squash player Vikram Malhotra.

History

Year-by-year results

Men's Squash 
Updated March 2020.

Players

Current roster 
Updated March 2020.

|}

Notable former players 
Notable alumni include:
 Ryan Donegan '05, Highest world ranking of 88, 4x All-American and 4x All-Ivy
 Chris Hanson (squash player) '13, Highest world ranking of 60, 1 PSA Title, 4x All-American and 4x All-Ivy, 2013 Skillman Award Winner

References

External links 
 Dartmouth Athletics

 
Sports clubs established in 1935
College men's squash teams in the United States